Ibrahim Abdel Rahman (born 1940) is an Egyptian water polo player. He competed in the 1960 Summer Olympics.

References

1940 births
Living people
Water polo players at the 1960 Summer Olympics
Egyptian male water polo players
Olympic water polo players of Egypt
Sportspeople from Cairo
20th-century Egyptian people